General elections were held in Liberia in 1903. In the presidential election Arthur Barclay of the True Whig Party was elected. He defeated former President William D. Coleman, who ran on the People's Party ticket. Barclay took office on 4 January 1904

References

Liberia
1903 in Liberia
Elections in Liberia
Election and referendum articles with incomplete results